Ryker Mathews (born November 28, 1992) is a professional Canadian football offensive tackle of the Canadian Football League (CFL). He attended Brigham Young University and went undrafted in the 2016 NFL Draft. He was later signed by the New Orleans Saints.

Professional career

New Orleans Saints
Mathews signed with the New Orleans Saints as an undrafted free agent on May 2, 2016. On August 1, 2016, he was waived by the Saints and placed on injured reserve.
On September 16, 2016, he was cut from the New Orleans Saints.

Hamilton Tiger-Cats
Mathews was signed by the Hamilton Tiger-Cats on July 25, 2017 and played for the team for two years.

New England Patriots
On January 14, 2019, Mathews signed a reserve/future contract with the New England Patriots. On May 2, 2019, the Patriots waived Matthews.

Hamilton Tiger-Cats (second stint)
On May 26, 2019, Mathews was re-signed by Hamilton.

BC Lions
Upon entering free agency, Mathews signed a two-year contract with the BC Lions on February 11, 2020.

References

External links
BC Lions bio
BYU bio
New Orleans Saints bio

1992 births
Living people
People from American Fork, Utah
Players of American football from Utah
American football offensive tackles
Canadian football offensive linemen
BYU Cougars football players
New Orleans Saints players
Hamilton Tiger-Cats players
New England Patriots players
BC Lions players
American players of Canadian football